Harry George Barchard (25 June 1860 – 28 July 1935) was an English cricketer who played for Lancashire. He was born in Crumpsall, Manchester and educated at Uppingham School and died in Seaton, Devon.

Barchard made a single first-class appearance for the team, in 1888, against Oxford University. In two innings, Barchard scored 45 runs with the bat, and took one catch in the outfield. Barchard was a lower-order batsman for the team.

He married Constance Honoria Haye Maxwell and she died three weeks before he did in 1935.

References

1860 births
1935 deaths
English cricketers
Lancashire cricketers
People from Crumpsall